Buhi, officially the Municipality of Buhi (Buhinon: Banwaan nya Buhi; Rinconada Bikol: Banwāan ka Buhi; Tagalog: Bayan ng Buhi), is a 1st class world class municipality in the province of Camarines Sur, Philippines. According to the 2020 census, it has a population of 81,306 people.

According to the Guinness Book of World Records, Lake Buhi is home to the world's smallest edible fish locally known as "Sinarapan".

Buhi is not just known for Lake Buhi but it is likewise the home to the world's smallest commercial fish locally known as the sinarapan (Mystychtis luzonensis).

History

The town known today as Buhi began as a small settlement by refugees fleeing the outrage of Mayon Volcano hundreds of years ago. These people founded a permanent settlement in an area close to the lake and flourished as time passed.

The general exodus of people fleeing and being able to escape grave calamities such as Mayon's eruption was known in local vernacular as "naka-buhi". Local lore takes this as the most probable explanation as to how the town acquired its present name – Buhi. One version of local legend attributes the town being accorded the name to the time when the first Spaniards came and asked local settlers the name of the area. The local settlers misunderstood the question as how they came to be there and so gave the response "Naka-Buhi".

There were two patron saints with whom the town directed their devotion. The first was St. Francis of Assisi placed in the church made of wooden materials. Unfortunately, in 1730 the church was razed down by fire. It was, however, replaced by a stone structure built under the supervision of Rev. Fray Jose de Cerda. Another saint was installed, St. Anthony of Padua.

On December 28, 1995, 13 people of Sitio Bogtong, Barangay Gabas were killed, three of whom were beheaded, by four gunmen inside a house, with survivors numbering at least seven. The massacre arose due to disputes over a 24-hectare farm land previously owned by the assassinated Cristito Nieva Jr. and his wife Ester; two of the victims, Estelito Campo and Alex Gaite, were petitioners in an agrarian case that had the Nieva couple as respondents. A witness pointed to brothers Toto and Rogelio "Crisboy" Clyde and two of their relatives as being the perpetrators of the crime.

Geography

Buhi is located in the south-eastern part of the province of Camarines Sur. It is bound on the east by Mount Malinao, on the west by Mount Asog and Iriga City, on the north by Sagñay-Buhi mountain ranges and on the south by the low-lying ranges of Polangui, Albay, with the following coordinates: 13 degrees 25’ 32.4" north latitude and 123 degrees 30’ 49.1" east longitude.

The municipality has been divided into five sectors, namely:
The Poblacion
The Lake/Mt. Asog sector
the Road/cross road sector
The Mountain sector
The Malangkaw Sector

Topography
Buhi has generally mountainous and hilly surface, with 50% of its area having a slope of around 25%. The Poblacion located on the south shore of Lake Buhi, has gently rolling topography.

Itbog Falls located in Barangay Santa Cruz, on the south-eastern side of Lake Buhi, is a  twin waterfalls. It could be reached by means of a motorized boat ride from the town proper, then a 30-minute trek.

Climate

Buhi has a warm, humid climate. During the warmest months from March to June, temperatures reach .

Land use

All other areas are cultivated for agriculture, quarry and human settlement. Higher slopes east and north of Lake Buhi are predominantly forests and secondary brushland.

About  are open water spaces of Lake Buhi, and other lakes and streams.

Barangays
Buhi is politically subdivided into 38 barangays.

Demographics

The total population was 70,756 in 2007, with a growth rate of about 2.1%. The total number of households was 13,238 and with an average household size of 5 persons. At the 2010 census, the population has increased to 73,809 persons. The local language is Buhinon, a dialect of Bikolano.

Literacy rate of Buhi is about 99%. The labor force is about 24,000 people strong, or 63% of economically productive people age 15 to 64 years old.

8 out of 10 persons are Roman Catholics; Iglesia ni Cristo makes up about 2% of the total population which is the largest minority religion in the municipality.

Language

Buhinon is the mother tongue of the majority of the population especially those residing around the lake area with Rinconada Bikol as its first language especially the folks residing on the eastern part of the municipality near Iriga City. Buhinon is classified as a lone language, and the only one used in the province of Camarines Sur. Buhinon, the Albay Bikol languages, and Rinconada Bikol are members of Inland Bikol group of languages and share common vocabulary.

Economy 

Two thirds of the population depends on agriculture
More than one-fifth of the total land area is devoted to agriculture primary crops are rice, corn, coconut, and abaca
Rice grows in the vast field of Road sector while corn and abaca are being grown at Mountain sector

Infrastructure

Transportation

Three major road networks that link the town to the adjacent province of Albay, Partido District and Iriga City. Most of its roads are gravel, especially those in the lake, road and mountain sectors.
Presence of tricycles and jeepneys
Presence of non-aircon and aircon buses
Presence of motorized boats and bancas
Presence of motorcycles called door-to-door

Utilities

Water supply:
Rural Waterworks Multi-Purposegbihjb
Cooperative provides the potable drinking water to at least 1,683 households in 7 suburban areas
Pongol Hot Spring
Balerite Resort
Lologon Resort
Burabod ririgusan- tubog Lourdes Buhi Camarines sur
Magindara

Power and electricity:
CASURECO III delivers electricity to 63% of households and business establishments and 97% of barangays
Host to a 1.2 MW mini hydro-electric power plant of the National Power Corporation

Health

Presence of 1 public hospital; 3 private medical clinics; 38 health stations/centers; 3 pharmacies

Public Hospital:
Buhi Community Hospital (temporarily closed by DOH)

Private Clinics:
Claveria Clinic
Portugal Clinic
Sabio-Valenciano Clinic

Education

No. of pre-schools: 33 public and 4 private schools
No. of elementary schools: 33 public and 4 private schools
No. of high schools: 3 private and 6 public schools
No. of colleges: 1 state college
No. of universities: 1 state university

State colleges
Camarines Sur Polytechnic Colleges

Public high schools
Santa Justina National High School 
Tambo Barangay National High School
San Vicente Barangay National High School
Lourdes High School(New Open Public High school)
Iraya High School (New Open Public High School)
Salvacion High School (New Open Public High School)
Santa Isabel High School(Soon to Operate)
John Mark Memorial High School

Private high schools
Buhi St. Joseph's Academy Inc. (formerly St. Joseph's Academy)
Buhi Lyceum
St. Bridget School

Private elementary schools
Buhi Institute Foundation
Holy Child Educational Center (Buhi Branch)
Buhi Lyceum
Elen O. Villanueva School

Media

Social media
Buhi Online: www.buhi.com
Buhi Forum : @buhiforum 
Banwaang Mauyay : @BanwaangMauyay

FM stations
88.5 DWLF-FM Barita 88.5 (relay of Barita 97/7 FM Goa - Rural Airwaves Media Service (RAMS)- Inactive
97.7 DWEA FM – Buhi (Radyo Buhi, Numero Uno) Celebrates its 7th anniversary (September 11, 2010)
100.1 Radyo Natin-Buhi (Sa Buhi Ika Sana)
102.9 DWLR – Lauyay Radio (closed)

Gallery

References

External links

Buhi Online/BOL (www.buhi.com) – The 1st Online Community of Buhi (est. 1998)
[ Philippine Standard Geographic Code]
Philippine Census Information

Municipalities of Camarines Sur